Alpha Omega (also referred to as Alpha-Omega or Alpha III Omega) is the third album by the New York hardcore band Cro-Mags. It was released in 1992 on Century Media Records. In 2013, German record label Demons Run Amok Entertainment re-issued it on vinyl. The album features their former vocalist John Joseph who had been expelled from the band in 1987.

According to founding guitarist and songwriter Parris Mayhew, he wrote most of Alpha Omega with former guitarist Rob Buckley. However, neither Mayhew or Buckley played on the actual recording, and the claim has been disputed by Flanagan and others.

Release and reception 

In an AllMusic review, Vincent Jeffries said "This partial assemblage of the classic Cro-Mags lineup features bassist Harley Flanagan and singer John "Bloodclot" Joseph together again after years of separation. The two musicians had last joined forces on the band's seminal hardcore debut, The Age of Quarrel. Doug Holland (guitars), Gabby (guitars), and Dave DiCenso (drums) fill out the lineup for this, the group's third studio recording. With music penned by Flanagan and original guitarist Parris Mayhew, this 1992 release delivers a steady stream of straightforward metal. Alpha-Omega bears only a small resemblance to the frenzied, more destructive style that embodied '80s East Coast hardcore and on which the Cro-Mags' reputation was solidly built. Standout tracks "The Other Side of Madness" and "The Paths of Perfection" have a relatively subdued, melodic texture that furthers the band's career-long gravitation away from its hardcore roots. While certainly a decent offering, this record falls short of its creators' best work."

Track listing

Personnel 
Cro-Mags
 John Joseph – lead vocals
 Harley Flanagan – bass, backing vocals
 Doug Holland – lead guitar
 Gabby Abularach – rhythm guitar
 Dave di Censo – drums

Production
 Recorded in 1991 at Normandy Sound, Warren, Rhode Island
 Produced by Tom Soares
 Engineered by Tom Soares

References 

Century Media Records albums
1992 albums
Cro-Mags albums

Demons Run Amok Entertainment albums